The Ghosts Of London is a book written by Henry Vollam Morton ("H.V."), published in 1939 by Methuen & Co Limited in London. Far from being on the subject of ghosts and the supernatural, Morton's book is instead a sentimental portrait of historic London juxtaposed with contemporary (1930s) London. The book is made up of 30 short histories and anecdotes, likely collected from his work as a journalist.

Subjects profiled in the book include snuff, herb shops (including a recipe for making Aqua vitae), the London curfew, hansom cabs, lamplighters, Ely Place, the Royal Waxworks, the bells of St. Paul's Cathedral, Lambeth Palace, Big Ben and Huguenot weavers.

A dozen black-and-white photos appear in the original edition, mostly credited to the London Daily Herald.

The Ghosts of London pages 1 - 14 

The first chapter is about the changes within London during times of war. Henry writes about a still autumn morning on the 3rd September 1939, he heard on the wireless that Britain was at war with Germany and that "In a twinkling the world had changed." He writes about how in the event of war your priorities change, he decided he wanted to change his will but found that due to the war his solicitors had moved all their documents to the countryside for safe keeping. Civilian army defense are described as wearing shrapnel helmets and armlets, patrolling the streets, directing the traffic and manning alarm sirens ready to direct people to safety. Henry then goes on to describe the sandbagged buildings, windows criss-crossed with gummed paper and an emptiness of London particularly Charing Cross. He describes how the sounds of London changed. Due to people leaving the city, dairy farmers were selling their ponies as there was not enough work for them. Henry writes about not wanting to contemplate not seeing the horse and carts, that because they are a familiar sight they usually go unnoticed. The book says that one of the strangest things about this war is the return of popularity in the London cellar. People began to show others around their cellars, Henry writes of his experience of being shown the cellar at his tailor's shop. The tailor led him down the stone steps into a crypt, the walls were framed with timber, there was a concrete crawl space that was said to be the emergency exit route that ran under the street. The book then goes on to describe Gas masks becoming an item that was necessary at all times, he describes that some companies tried to make fancy cases for the gas masks but they were out of tune with the times due to people not feeling any pride in owning a gas mask. Henry describes the blackouts in wartime London, the shops close at dusk and people travel home. He ends the chapter describing various battles London has overcome. "Wars come to an end, but London goes on

"Charlie's Day" pages 15 - 24 

Chapter two describes Oak Apple Day, on 29 May up until 1859 people celebrated the birthday of King Charles II, he had been exiled for 12 years and returned to London on his 13th birthday. Henry gives an account of being a child in Warwickshire, the children would collect sprigs of Oak with Oak-Apples attached and attach them to their caps and jumpers. They would then use handkerchiefs or paper to collect stinging nettles. He describes how they would search for boys without the Oak leaves and if any were found to not be wearing them would get stung across his knees or hands with the nettles. Henry goes on to give a description of the "six week wanderings of Charles II after Cromwell had beaten him from hedge to hedge in Worcester". Henry writes that Charles hid in the branches of a great oak for 24 hrs in Boscobel Woods with Colonel Careless. After his restoration the Oak became the symbol of loyalty to the crown, Royal Oak was soon a popular tavern name and on the anniversary villagers would decorate with oak boughs and gilded oak apples. He describes how The Chelsea Pensioners polished their medals and paraded before a statue of King Charles II decorated with oak boughs at The Royal Hospital which he founded. Henry then describes correspondence he had received from a newspaper article he had wrote enquiring about the tradition. In the west of England children would sing "It's Oak Apple Day, The twenty-ninth of may, If you don't give us a holiday, We'll all run away."  The other places said to be still following the tradition were Shropshire, Northamptonshire and Warwickshire, Staffordshire, Burton-on-Trent, Stretton, Belton Loughborough Leicestershire, Fernhurst Sussex, Essex, Cambridgeshire, Derbyshire and "nearly all the Midland Counties."

Horn-Blowers of The Temple pages 25 - 29

Chapter three describes the tradition of the Horn-Blowers of The Temple Church. It describes how at "six-thirty a man in a brass buttoned frock-coat, wearing a silk hat bound with a gold braid, has come out of Middle Temple Hall and stands in Fountain Court, Holding a long curved horn to his lips. He is one of four warders of the Temple. During the four law terms he appears every night in the ancient courtyards to blow a dinner warning to the students." It is described that the first call is made from Fountain Court where he stands facing the lawns of the Inner Temple Gardens, next the horn is blown in New Court, Essex court, Brick Court, Elm Court and Middle Temple Hall. When the Horn-Blower has finished he then returns to Middle Temple Hall and receives the gift of the legal profession a pint of old ale. The remainder of the chapter has information about the origins of the Horn-Blower and The Temple coming from the Knights Templar.

A Pinch of Snuff pages 30 - 35
Chapter four describes a tobacconists shop in Haymarket. it is said be a bow fronted shop with Georgian windows displaying ancient tobacco jars and snuff canisters. The shop sold seventeen types of snuff including a blend that was made popular by Beau Brummell. Within the shop old ledgers are kept which list the favourite snuffs used by George IV, Henry notes that one of the called Marina is no longer available. Henry describes that snuff taking was still quite popular but it was fading out. He says in the book that the largest snuff grinding mill is in Ireland and that there are others in Northern England.   He describes how people with professions that prohibited them from smoking while on duty were still able to enjoy a pinch of snuff. A newspaper compositor that was known to the author is said that he "was in the habit of celebrating the foundrywards departure of the home page with Gargantuan draughts of snuff. As soon as the page had left the case-room, he brought a large tin from his pocket and, extending his bare arm, laid a thick trail of powder from the elbow to the wrist. He would then lower his head and pass his great nose in rapid motion along the brown powder. Nothing would be left but a few grains lying among the hairs and the painter's ink."  Henry claims that he had never seen this person sneeze and that they carried a reputation of never getting colds. The author writes about Sir George Rooke's expedition to Vigo in 1702, the English fleet landed and plundered cargo which included "snuff in galleons" which had arrived in Cadiz from Havana. The loot was said to weigh around 50 tons and was sold by sailors at ports in Plymouth, Portsmouth and Chatham for 3d and 4d. Henry describes the rules of offering snuff set out by Robert Steele in the spectator, they included the pinch scornful, the pinch surly, the pinch politick and the pinch careless. Henry describes how the popularity of snuff grew amongst women, he gives an example a lady named Mrs Margaret Thompson who died on the 2nd April 1776 and left a will directing to be buried in snuff. The will requested that the "six greatest snuff takers in the parish of St James Westminster," Furthermore her request was continued that six maidens were to be her pall bearers that they were to wear snuff coloured beaver hats instead of black. Margaret also wanted them to each carry a box filled with " the best scotch snuff to take as their refreshments as the go along."  she also made a request that her servant Sarah Stuart  walk before her corpse, distributing every 20 yards a large handful of snuff to the ground and upon the crowd. The most expensive snuff to be sold is said to have cost £3 per pound in weight and that it was sold with a rose scented vinegar from Spain called Vinagrillo, it was used to soften the snuff. Spanish Sabullia was another brand of snuff, it was a fine red brick powder believed to have medicinal properties. it was believed to harden the gums and became a popular toothpaste until 1890. In 1852 cigarettes are first mentioned but very few were sold until 1866 when Russian cigarettes became popular, snuff began to decline after this and it is said that one of the reasons behind snuffs decline was an increase in popularity for white handkerchiefs.

The Herb Shop pages 36 - 42
Chapter five begins with a poem: "Excellent herbs had our fathers of old- Excellent herbs to ease their pain - Alexanders and Marigold, Eyebright, Orris, and Elecampane. Basil, Rocket, Valerian, Rue (Almost singing themselves they run), Vervain, Dittany, Call-me-to-you- Cowslip, Melilot, Rose of the Sun."  Henry goes on to describe a herb shop in Farringdon Street not far from Ludgate Circus which had been open for one hundred and twenty years."(Potter & Clarke are among the largest and best known chemists in Great Britain) they have never forsaken the ancient remedies." He describes how the shop has been using the Elizabethan pharmacopoeia for prescribing herbs for well over a century. The shop used to have herbs hanging from the ceiling, in modern times the herbs were neatly packaged and or sold in weight. Some of the labels read "CherryLaurel" "Bittersweet" "Archangel" "Hedge-Hyssop" "Lady's Slipper" and "Mouse-Ear". The author then describes a customer in the shop who asked for "Half a pound of Slippery Elm." It was said that powdered bark of the Red Elm or Moose Elm "makes a gruel as nutritious as that made from oatmeal with the added virtue of soothing and healing the stomach. when coarsely ground and made into a poultice, Slippery Elm is the finest remedy in the world, I am told, for ulcers, wounds, chilblains and all inflammation." Henry also describes a porter from Smithfield market who came for medicine for kidney stones. The chemist claimed to not diagnose ailments but to suggest remedies based on their complaints. There was a herbarium at the back of the shop and the author describes some of the plants and said uses:

"St Johns Bread is a about four to eight inches long. You can make a broth from it which was used by singers in ancient times to improve their voices."

"The root of Ladies Slipper, powdered and taken in sweetened water, is a nerve tonic, gives sleep, and is useful for headaches and neuralgia"

"The root, stem and flower of the lily of the valley (half an ounce to a pint of boiling water) have been used for dropsy and valvular disease of the heart."

"Powdered Mistletoe leaves are used for hysteria, epilepsy and blood pressure."

"An infusion of powdered Mouse-ear is excellent for whooping cough."

"The Leaves of the Scarlet Pimpernel are good for dropsy and rheumatic affections, but the potent mixture (ten ounces of Scarlet pimpernel to one pint of diluted alcohol) must evidently be used with caution."

"The root and stem of the Primrose is an ancient remedy for muscular rheumatism, paralysis and gout but one that is now seldom used."

"Rosemary-oil cures headaches, is an excellent stomachic, a nerve tonic and, Combined with Borax, prevents premature baldness"

"A tea made of Shepherds Purse is good for all kidney complaints."

"Sunflower seeds, good Holland gin and sugar make a wonderful remedy for coughs, colds and pulmonary affections."

The book describes the shop as "probably the only place in London where he could obtain the ingredients" to make the Aquavita cocktail described in Gervase Markham's The English Housewife: the inward and outward Virtues which ought to be in a complete wife, written in 1649. the following recipe is given:

"To make Aquavita"

"Take of Rosemary flowers two handfuls of Marjoram, Winter-savory, Rosemary, Rew, TIme, Germander, Rybworte, Harts-tongue, Mousear, Whitewormewood, Buglosse, Red sage, Liver-wort, Hoarehound, fine Lavender, Islop-crops, Penny royall, Red fennell, of each one handful: of Elecompane rootes, cleane pared and sliced two handfuls: then take all foresaid and shred them, but not wash them, then take four gallons and more of strong ale and one gallon of sack lees, and put all these aforsaid hearbes shread into it, and put into it one pound of Licoras bruised, halfe a pound of Aniseeds, Cleane sifted and bruised, and of mace and nutmeg bruised, one of each ounce.Then put together into your stilling pot, close covered with rye paste, and make a soft fire under your pot, and as the head of Limbeck heateth, draw out your hot water and put in cold, but see your fire not be to rash at the first. When the water is distilled take a gallon glasse with a wide mouth and put therein a bottle of the best water and clearest, and put into it a bottle if Rosa solis, halfe a pound of dates, bruised and one ounce of grains and half a pound of sugar, half an ounce of seede pearle beaten, three leaves of fine gold. stirre all these together well. Then stoppe your glasse and set it in the sunne the space of one or two months. Then clarify it and use it at your discretion: for a spoonful or two at a time is sufficient."

Curfew Bell pages 43 - 47
Chapter six gives a description of the curfew in London, that it was decreed by William the Conqueror the author notes that a curfew was rang at Oxford in the reign of Alfred the Great and that William may have tightened up those rules. When the bells rang it symbolised that fires had to be put out to lessen the chances of causing fire to the wooden buildings. Henry goes on to describe how in Norman times the curfew bell rang from St Martin's-le-Grande a church at eight pm. Henry writes that the location of the church is now the General Post Office. "Those bells could be heard far away among the open fields of charing to the west, across the marshy Thames to the south, over the moors to the east and among the forests that lay to the north." He describes the closing of the gates of London which began at the first chime, he writes "There were originally four main gates: Aldgate, on the east; Aldersgate, on the North; Ludgate, on the West; and Bridgegate, to the South bank of the Thames. It was possible, however, for travellers to gain entrance after the first notes of the Curfew by the wicket gates, which were not closed until the last of the warning."  At least four bells still sounded at the curfew time every night and they were the bells of Gray's Inn, Lincoln's Inn, The Tower of London and The Charterhouse. Henry questions why the tradition has been continued, he describes a story from York of a lost traveller who was afraid of being eaten by wolves, heard the bells and followed the sound to safety in Bootham Bar, in thankfulness he donated his money " for the curfew bell to be rung in York forever." Henry describes his visit to Charterhouse at half-past seven, he describes the place as being a slip back through time to the "England of the sixteenth century."   "When Carthusian monks were driven from this property, it came at length into the possession of Thomas Sutton, a shrewd Elizabethan soldier who, when on service in the north of the country had foreseen the commercial properties of the Durham coalfield. Coal and marriage with an heiress, made Sutton the richest commoner of his time. It was said that his annual income was £5,000 and his capital over £60,000." Henry writes that Charterhouse was "a school for poor boys and a retreat for old men who had fallen on bad days." Henry describes how 63 old men, bachelors and widows now live here, eat together, attend the chapel once a day and that they receive a pension of £1 per week. The bell rings once for each person who lives there, in this instance 63. Henry writes about watching the bell ringer, who asks him to not speak to him once he had started because it was important that he did not loose count. The author ends the chapter "I thought that this curfew is the only one left in England that is really a curfew, because now and then, when it misses a note, it signifies. to all who know the meaning, that a light has been quenched."

"Whose Keys" pages 48 - 53
Chapter seven gives an account of the ceremony of the keys at The Tower of London. The author for several years at the request of 2LO would go to the Byward Tower every night to speak the introduction of the ceremony. He writes: "The Tower is not only one of the most ancient buildings in use in England , but it is the only fortress that has been in continuous occupation for over eight centuries. The function of the Tower today is the same as when William the Conqueror founded it eleven years after the Battle of Hastings. It is still a royal palace. It is still a garrison and an armoury." He tells us of how it was customary for kings to spend the night in the tower before their coronation. Henry VII was moved here when Perkin Warbeck claimed to be heir to the throne. The author says that nobody knows when the ceremony of the "King's keys" was first observed, but the first was recorded in the time of Edward III performed by John of London. The ceremony begins "Shortly before ten at night" the Chief Warder dresses in "a long red cloak with his Tudor bonnet", he carries a lamp with a  "tallow candle," he picks up the keys to the "Wicket Gate and the Byward Tower" and calls for an "escort for the keys." "One N.C.O and four men fall in with rifles and fixed bayonets. The Chief Warder, with his lantern and the keys places himself in the centre, and off they march towards the Wicket Gate on Tower Hill." He describes how usually the Chief Warder would usually salute an officer, but during the ceremony the roles are reversed. "As they march along, every sentry on the way to the main gate stands to attention and presents arms. Civilians encountered on the march stand still and lift their hats."  First the wicket gate is closed, then the towers of the Outer ward, when the keys reach the arch of the Bloody Tower a sentry challenges them "Halt! Who comes there?"  "The keys! cries the Chief Warder."  "Whose keys?" "King George's Keys! cries the warder" "Pass, King George's Keys, All's well cries the sentry:" they continue up towards the guards room the warder steps forward with his lantern, lifts his bonnet and cries: "God preserve King George."  the guard replied "Amen." The story ends wit a story that the author is unsure if it is true or not but it was said that a line regiment took over the Tower, they rehearsed the ceremony well except for one sentry who remained silent a few times but he then replied "All right-I'll bite...Whose Keys?"

An Ordinary pages 54 - 59
Chapter eight begins by describing that the term "an ordinary" was used to describe something  "that is habitual, is very ancient. Henry describes "an ambassador in ordinary" as "an ambassador who is constantly resident in a foreign country." and a "physician in ordinary" as "a doctor who is always in attendance on the monarch. The rest of the chapter informs the reader about the tradition and meaning of an ordinary in the Taverns of London. Henry writes "In the reign of Queen Anne there seem to have been "ordinaries" for every purse. We read of "Fivepenny Ordinaries," and even a "Twopenny Ordinary." I suppose the modern substitute for the old fashioned "ordinary" is the four or five course table d'hôte made popular by the restaurants of Soho." Henry describes a tavern with an Innkeeper called Simpson, who began supplying fish dinners in 1723. The tavern was called the three tons and was in Bell Alley, near Billingsgate. Simpson retired and sold his Tavern but he opened a new tavern called the Queen's Arm in Bird in Hand Court, off Cheapside. The court was described as "essentially the same court that Keats saw when he sat in his lodgings there and wrote On first looking into chapman's homer." Henry states that Simpson's Two Shilling fish ordinary was one of the few things that hadn't gone up in price since 1914. He describes attending one of the fish ordinaries   they happened at 1pm everyday and Henry attended on a Friday. He describes being shown into a "brown experienced looking apartment on a upper floor where a large horseshoe table was set for fifty guests." In the room there was three throne like chairs that were said to have been made from wood rescued from the tavern during a fire in 1898. These seats were for the chairman and his two chief guests. Above the chairs where framed names of people who had correctly guessed "the weight, height and girth of a cheese". When it was guessed correctly it was celebrated by giving everyone champagne. He describes the guest who arrived as "city men and regular habitués; and few of them curious sight seers like myself.  For nearly two centuries the Fish Ordinary fought desperately against the inclusion of women, but about seventeen years ago the stronghold fell and now women sit down every day with men." The chairman was handed an apron, he was in charge of carving and serving the food. First up was soup, then stewed eels, next was fried plaice portioned to one fillet per person, Whitebaite and a four-foot roly-poly with hot syrup. The diners used the same Knife and forks for each course so it was easy to spot new comers as they lost their Knives and forks when the dirty plates were cleared away. The event ended with the guessing of the "colossal Cheshire cheese" was said to be on an Oak stand from "Nelson's Victory". Slices of cheese and pieces of paper were passed around, no one guessed all three correctly but a man who guessed the height and girth correctly was said to had been trying to win the competition for ten years but had never managed to correctly guess all three. The guests are said to have given the chairman a friendly nod or a handshake before going back to their business.

Hansom Cab pages 60 - 65 
Chapter nine Gives an account of a conversation with the driver of a Hansom cab, a man called Mr Albert Frisbee who lived in a bed-sitting-room in Newington Butts. He tells the author of how the world of the Hansom cab drivers were changing. Mr Frisbee had been a cab driver for 40 years, Mr Frisbee and his companions, Mr Lamont an Mr Woolf are said by the author to be the last 3 drivers left out of the 15,000 that used to be, Mr Frisbee's licence number was 14,037. Mr Frisbee  begins by saying "There's a funny ring about gold" "a blind man could tell a falling sovereign from a shilling. But perhaps you have never heard the sound sovereigns make when they fall on the pavement - fifty jimmy-o'-goblins coming down like hail?" Henry says no he had not, Mr Frisbee tells him that he never will because "the days when the toffs and the mashers used to chuck there money about is gone, finally and forever there isn't any money to chuck about today." Mr frisbee gets side-tracked and describes the past days as happier times and that things where cheaper. Mr Frisbee continues with the sovereign story, he said that when he was in his cab one morning outside a nightclub in Regent Street, a man who Mr frisbee describes as "a toff in evening dress" threw sovereigns on to the floor and that all the drivers scrambled down to collect them, he then threw another handful and the drivers again collected them. Mr Frisbee says that there was over 50 sovereigns picked up. Mr Frisbee describes the mornings standing in Leicester square as cold, that he used to meet 6 people and they would go to The Continental when it opened at 5 o'clock and started the day with "a pint of rum and a jug of hot water". The passengers who use the cab are described as the curious, the romantic, the people who have had to much to drink and find it comical, Mr Frisbee is said to take a bleak view of the people who saw the Handsome as a joke. Mr frisbee is said to have commented on carrying old gentlemen who remember what London was like before the Boer War. He goes on to describe the difficulties in getting a Hansom cab repaired, that he needed a new pump shaft, after trying various places he finally managed to track down an 80-year-old man who he persuaded to do the job even though he had retired. He describes the pride they had in their horses and that they used to call the embankment "the racecourse". Henry finishes the chapter giving a brief account of the invention and inventor of the Hansom cab. Henry gives the name Joseph Aloysius Hansom born in York in 1903. he says that Hansom "sold the rights to his Patent Safety cab in 1834 for £10,000 but the company never paid, and all he was paid was £300." Henry writes that after Hansom designed and built Birmingham Town Hall but the transaction, owing to a reckless agreement, caused his bankruptcy." Hansom died when he was 80 and long before the motor car was invented. Henry lists other places attributed to Hansom which are St Walpurge's church Preston Lancashire, The cathedral in Plymouth, the Jesuit Collage in Manchester and the church of St Philip Neri at Arundel.

Lights pages 72 - 77
Chapter eleven

"Order, Order" pages 78 - 85 
Chapter twelve

Ely Place: Twelve O'clock and All's Well pages 86 - 91
Chapter thirteen

Yeoman of the Guard pages 92 - 98 
Chapter fourteen

Royal Waxworks page 99 - 105
Chapter fifteen

Bells of St Paul's pages 106 - 113
Chapter sixteen

At the Coffee Pot pages 114 - 119
Chapter seventeen

Bank Guard pages 120 - 126
Chapter eighteen

Nails as Rent pages 127 - 131
Chapter nineteen

Beating the Bounds pages 132 - 136
Chapter twenty

"Remember The Grotter" pages 137 - 143
Chapter twenty one

Lambeth Dole pages 144 - 149
Chapter twenty two

Shepherd Market pages 250 - 159 
Chapter twenty three

Big Ben's Cradle pages 160 - 165
Chapter twenty four

Leech Merchant pages 166 - 171
Chapter twenty five

Last of the Huguenot Weavers pages 172 - 175
Chapter twenty six

Ale and Eye Lotion pages 176 - 181
Chapter twenty seven

The "Lion Sermon" pages 182 - 186
Chapter twenty eight

Maundy Money pages 187 - 191 
Chapter twenty nine

Red Dragon's Office pages 192 
chapter Thirty

References

1939 books
British books
Methuen Publishing books